Bobin may refer to:

Bobin, Lesser Poland Voivodeship, Poland
Bobin, Masovian Voivodeship, Poland
Bobin, New South Wales, Australia

People with the surname
Christian Bobin (1951–2022), French author and poet
David Bobin (1945–2017), English sports journalist
James Bobin, English film director

See also
 Bobbin (disambiguation)